The C.E.I.P.P., or the Centre (formerly Cercle) d'Etudes sur l'île de Pâques et la Polynésie ("Study Centre (formerly "Circle") on Easter Island and Polynesia") is a geographic and anthropological group created by André Valenta and Michel-Alain Jumeau.

The CEIPP is notable for its members' publications on Easter Island. These include:
Nouveau Regard sur l'île de Pâques, a collective work published by Moana Editions, Saintry-sur-Seine, 1982
Les Mystères Résolus de l'île de Pâques, a collective work published by Editions Step, Évry, 1993. 
Michel-Alain Jumeau and Yves Pioger's Bibliographie de l'île de Pâques. Publications de la Société des Océanistes, nº46, Musée de l'Homme, Paris, 1997. .

The CEIPP also houses the Thomas Barthel archives of rongorongo, making the data available in digitized format, cross-checking his line drawings of the rongorongo corpus with available photographs and the rubbings he used, and expanding his list of glyphs and his glyph-referencing system.

They publish the Bulletin du Centre d'études sur l'île de Pâques et la Polynésie.

External links
CEIPP website

Easter Island
Organisations based in Chile
Polynesian culture
Geographic societies
Geography organizations